Kirk Kerkorian School of Medicine at the University of Nevada, Las Vegas (UNLV), is an academic division of the University of Nevada, Las Vegas (UNLV) with 60 students matriculated on July 17, 2017. The students began their education with a 6 week EMT course. The school is the first to grant the Doctor of Medicine (MD) degree in Southern Nevada. The school uses facilities in the University Medical Center of Southern Nevada (UMCSN) clinical building at the Las Vegas Medical District.

History
Barbara F. Atkinson was hired by UNLV as the Planning Dean on May 19, 2014. The school was officially founded on August 22, 2014 when the Nevada System of Higher Education (NSHE) Board of Regents approved a two year budget, and the school submitted its accreditation application to the LCME on September 29, 2014.  A joint legislative budget subcommittee approved an initial $1.2 million for FY2016 and $7.1 million for FY2017 to fund development on May 7, 2015. An additional $5.9 million for FY2016 and $12.5 million for FY2017 were added from the General Fund upon final adoption of SB514 on June 11, 2015.  Barbara Atkinson was promoted from Planning Dean to Founding Dean on November 10, 2015. The LCME transitioned the school from applicant to candidate status on February 11, 2016 and the school received preliminary accreditation by the LCME on October 18, 2016. In August 2016, the ACGME approved the transfer to UNLV of all Las Vegas based residencies and fellowships previously associated with the University of Nevada, Reno School of Medicine, effective July 1, 2017.  The first White Coat Ceremony was conducted on August 25, 2017.

The Clark County Commission approved a 3 year lease of the University Medical Center of Southern Nevada (UMCSN) clinical building at 1524 Pinto Lane, in the Las Vegas Medical District, on September 10, 2015.  The Clark County Commission then approved the transfer of 9 acres of land at 625 Shadow Lane to the school on June 21, 2016, on which the school plans to build a new 170,000 square feet building for about $100 million.

As of July 24, 2019, Atkinson announced she will transition from dean into an advisory leadership role with the school, effective Sept. 1, 2019 citing personal reasons for the change after leading the school during its crucial formative years.  In April 2020, Dr. Marc J. Kahn began his tenure as Dean of the School

Philanthropy
In April 2015, UNLV committed to paying the entire 4-year medical school tuition for its initial class of 60 students. A $10 million donation from the Engelstad Family Foundation announced in June 2015 exceeded this goal, providing 100 students, 25 in each class over the first 4 years, with full tuition.

Anthony Marlon, a Las Vegas cardiologist and founder of Sierra Health Services, donated $2 million in September 2015 to help form the Department of Orthopedic Surgery.

The United Health Foundation donated $3 million in April 2016 to develop community clinics and educational programs.

An anonymous donation of $25 million matched $25 million in new legislative funding, authorized by the Nevada Legislature on June 5, 2017.

Curriculum 
UNLV School of Medicine offers medical students a hands-on, community focused curriculum grounded in technology and innovation. Students are immediately immersed into the medical field with the first phase of the curriculum being a six-week course ending with each student becoming a certified emergency medical technician (EMT).

During the second phase, students will have the opportunity to work in small groups to learn medical Spanish, virtual microscopy and virtual anatomy. UNLV School of medicine is one of the first medical schools to opt for 3-D touchscreen visuals instead of cadavers. Along with UNLV School of Medicine’s virtual anatomy, students benefit from a virtual library. Books, journal articles, videos, and data is available digitally through EZProxy, a cross platform cloud environment which allows students access to the library from anywhere in the world.

Students will receive a full year of outpatient, integrated clerkships. They will work closely with physicians and nurses in the specialties of: Emergency Medicine, Family Medicine, Internal Medicine, Obstetrics and Gynecology, Orthopedic Surgery, Otolaryngology, Pediatrics, Psychiatry, and Surgery. Along with working with healthcare professionals, students will work with UNLV’s William F. Harrah Hotel College of Hotel Administration learning hospitality techniques, offering a new approach to patient care.

In the third phase of the curriculum, students will begin hospital internships, electives and completion of a scholarly project. In an effort to ease the transition into residency, each student will have an intensive capstone rotation individualized to their field of study.

Affiliated hospitals
Hospitals that assist in the instruction of medical students, residents, and fellows from the UNLV School of Medicine include University Medical Center of Southern Nevada, Sunrise Hospital & Medical Center, VA Southern Nevada Healthcare System, and the Mike O'Callaghan Federal Hospital.

Graduate medical education
The residencies and fellowships of the UNLV School of Medicine, as of July 1, 2017:

Residencies

Fellowships

References

External links
 

2014 establishments in Nevada
Educational institutions established in 2014
Medical schools in Nevada
University of Nevada, Las Vegas